8-Hydroxyquinoline (also known as oxine) is an organic compound derived from the heterocycle quinoline.  A colorless solid, its conjugate base is a chelating agent, which one was used for the quantitative determination of metal ions.

In aqueous solution 8-hydroxyquinoline has a pKa value of ca. 9.9 It reacts with metal ions, losing the proton and forming 8-hydroxyquinolinato-chelate complexes.

The aluminium complex, is a common component of organic light-emitting diodes (OLEDs).  Substituents on the quinoline ring affect the luminescence properties.

In its photo-induced excited-state, 8-hydroxyquinoline converts to zwitterionic isomers, in which the hydrogen atom is transferred from oxygen to nitrogen.

Bioactivity
The complexes as well as the heterocycle itself exhibit antiseptic, disinfectant, and pesticide properties, functioning as a transcription inhibitor. Its solution in alcohol is used in liquid bandages. It once was of interest as an anti-cancer drug.

A thiol analogue, 8-mercaptoquinoline is also known.  

The roots of the invasive plant Centaurea diffusa release 8-hydroxyquinoline, which has a negative effect on plants that have not co-evolved with it.

See also
 Clioquinol, an antifungal drug and antiprotozoal drug.
 PBT2
 QUPIC
 Ionophore
 Trace metal detection test

References 

Antiseptics
Quinolinols